După Deal may refer to several villages in Romania:

 După Deal, a village in Lupșa Commune, Alba County
 După Deal, a village in Ponor, Alba
 După Deal, a village in Milaș Commune, Bistriţa-Năsăud County
 După Deal, a village in Pietrari, Dâmbovița
 După Deal, a village in Cuci Commune, Mureș County
 După Deal, a village in Iclănzel Commune, Mureș County